Eremocoris ferus is a species of dirt-colored seed bug in the family Rhyparochromidae. It is found in North America.

References

Rhyparochromidae
Hemiptera of North America
Insects described in 1832
Taxa named by Thomas Say
Articles created by Qbugbot